The enzyme N-acylneuraminate-9-phosphatase (EC 3.1.3.29) catalyzes the reaction 

N-acylneuraminate 9-phosphate + H2O  N-acylneuraminate + phosphate

This enzyme belongs to the family of hydrolases, specifically those acting on phosphoric monoester bonds.  The systematic name is ''N-acylneuraminate-9-phosphate phosphohydrolase. Other names in common use include acylneuraminate 9-phosphatase, N-acylneuraminic acid 9-phosphate phosphatase, and N''-acylneuraminic (sialic) acid 9-phosphatase.  This enzyme participates in aminosugars metabolism.

References

 

EC 3.1.3
Enzymes of unknown structure